Erbol Kanatbekovich Ataba

ev (born 15 August 2001) is a Kyrgyz footballer who plays as a midfielder for Dynamo Makhachkala.

Club career
Born in Kant, Kyrgyzstan, Atabayev started his career with Abdysh-Ata Kant at the age of five. During his time with Abdysh-Ata Kant, he was linked with Spanish side Real Madrid, but would eventually go on to sign for Russian side Rubin Kazan at the age of eleven. While at Rubin, his father claimed the family were forced to obtain Russian citizenship in order for Atabayev to play. After two years in Russia, Atabayev made a stunning move to Spanish side Barcelona, becoming the first Kyrgyz player to play for the club.

Atabayev's time in Catalonia was not memorable, with then-sporting director Albert Puig saying that he had "hadn't heard anything" of Atabayev. After leaving Barcelona in 2013, he moved around a number of different Spanish clubs, eventually moving from Josep Maria Gené to Granollers in 2019.

His first taste of senior football came for Primera Catalana side Santboià, with whom he made five appearances in the 2020–21 season, scoring once. However, in April 2021 he returned to Kyrgyzstan to re-join boyhood club Abdysh-Ata Kant.

Having moved again from Kyrgyzstan to Russia, he signed with Dynamo Makhachkala in February 2022. He scored his first goal for the club against rivals Anzhi Makhachkala in May 2022, helping his team to secure promotion.

International career
In March 2022, Atabayev regained Kyrgyz citizenship, making him eligible for the national team. In May of the same year, he was called up to the Kyrgyzstan national football team for 2023 AFC Asian Cup qualification matches.

Career statistics

Club

International

References

2001 births
Living people
Kyrgyzstani footballers
Kyrgyzstan youth international footballers
Kyrgyzstan international footballers
Russian footballers
Association football midfielders
FC Abdysh-Ata Kant players
FC Rubin Kazan players
FC Barcelona players
CE L'Hospitalet players
CF Gavà players
EC Granollers players
FC Santboià players
FC Dynamo Makhachkala players
Primera Catalana players
Kyrgyz Premier League players
Russian Second League players
Russian First League players
Kyrgyzstani expatriate footballers
Expatriate footballers in Spain
Kyrgyzstani expatriate sportspeople in Spain